Romance of the Redwoods may refer to:

 A Romance of the Redwoods, a 1917 American silent drama film 
 Romance of the Redwoods (1939 film), an American film